Gonadotropic cells (called also Gonadotropes or Gonadotrophs or Delta Cells or Delta basophils) are endocrine cells in the anterior pituitary that produce the gonadotropins, such as the follicle-stimulating hormone (FSH) and luteinizing hormone (LH).  Release of FSH and LH by gonadotropes is regulated by gonadotropin-releasing hormone (GnRH) from the hypothalamus.

Gonadotropes appear basophilic in histological preparations.

Gonadotropes have insulin receptors, which can be overstimulated by too high insulin levels. This may lead to infertility as hormone release levels are disrupted.

Gonadotropes are feedback inhibited by specific hormones, including estradiol.

See also 
List of human cell types derived from the germ layers

References 

Peptide hormone secreting cells
Human cells
Human female endocrine system